The Best of Eddie Money is a compilation album by American rock singer Eddie Money, released in July 2001, and contains 16 digitally remastered tracks.

Track listing

References

2001 greatest hits albums
Eddie Money compilation albums
Columbia Records compilation albums
Legacy Recordings compilation albums